A chemotroph is an organism that obtains energy by the oxidation of electron donors in their environments. These molecules can be organic (chemoorganotrophs) or inorganic (chemolithotrophs).  The chemotroph designation is in contrast to phototrophs, which use photons. Chemotrophs can be either autotrophic or heterotrophic. Chemotrophs can be found in areas where electron donors are present in high concentration, for instance around hydrothermal vents.

Chemoautotroph

Chemoautotrophs, in addition to deriving energy from chemical reactions, synthesize all necessary organic compounds from carbon dioxide. Chemoautotrophs can use inorganic energy sources such as hydrogen sulfide, elemental sulfur, ferrous iron, molecular hydrogen, and ammonia or organic sources to produce energy.  Most chemoautotrophs are extremophiles, bacteria or archaea that live in hostile environments (such as deep sea vents) and are the primary producers in such ecosystems. Chemoautotrophs generally fall into several groups: methanogens,  sulfur oxidizers and reducers, nitrifiers, anammox bacteria, and thermoacidophiles. An example of one of these prokaryotes would be Sulfolobus. Chemolithotrophic growth can be dramatically fast, such as Hydrogenovibrio crunogenus with a doubling time around one hour.

The term "chemosynthesis", coined in 1897 by Wilhelm Pfeffer, originally was defined as the energy production by oxidation of inorganic substances in association with autotrophy—what would be named today as chemolithoautotrophy. Later, the term would include also the chemoorganoautotrophy, that is, it can be seen as a synonym of chemoautotrophy.

Chemoheterotroph
Chemoheterotrophs (or chemotrophic heterotrophs) are unable to fix carbon to form their own organic compounds.  Chemoheterotrophs can be chemolithoheterotrophs, utilizing inorganic electron sources such as sulfur, or, much more commonly, chemoorganoheterotrophs, utilizing organic electron sources such as carbohydrates, lipids, and proteins. Most animals and fungi are examples of chemoheterotrophs, as are halophiles.

Iron- and manganese-oxidizing bacteria

Iron-oxidizing bacteria are chemotrophic bacteria that derive energy by oxidizing dissolved ferrous iron. They are known to grow and proliferate in waters containing iron concentrations as low as 0.1 mg/L. However, at least 0.3 ppm of dissolved oxygen is needed to carry out the oxidation.

Iron is a very important element required by living organisms to carry out numerous metabolic reactions such as the formation of proteins involved in biochemical reactions. Examples of these proteins include iron–sulfur proteins, hemoglobin, and coordination complexes. Iron has a widespread distribution globally and is considered one of the most abundant in the Earth's crust, soil, and sediments. Iron is a trace element in marine environments. Its role in the metabolism of some chemolithotrophs is probably very ancient.

As Liebig's law of the minimum notes, the essential element present in the smallest amount (called limiting factor) is the one that determines the growth rate of a population. Iron is the most common limiting element in phytoplankton communities and has a key role in structuring and determining their abundance. It is particularly important in the high-nutrient, low-chlorophyll regions, where the presence of micronutrients is mandatory for the total primary production.

See also 
 Chemosynthesis
 Lithotroph
RISE project Expedition that discovered high temperature vent communities

Notes

References

1.  Katrina Edwards.  Microbiology of a Sediment Pond and the Underlying Young, Cold, Hydrologically Active Ridge Flank.  Woods Hole Oceanographic Institution.

2.  Coupled Photochemical and Enzymatic Mn(II) Oxidation Pathways of a Planktonic Roseobacter-Like Bacterium 
Colleen M. Hansel and Chris A. Francis* 
Department of Geological and Environmental Sciences, Stanford University, Stanford, California 94305-2115 
Received 28 September 2005/ Accepted 17 February 2006

Biology terminology
Trophic ecology
Microbial growth and nutrition
Planktology